Fifty Degrees Below (2005) is the second book in the hard science fiction Science in the Capital trilogy by Kim Stanley Robinson. It directly follows the events of Forty Signs of Rain, with a greater focus on character Frank Vanderwal, and his decision to remain at the National Science Foundation, following the earlier novel’s superstorm and devastating flood of Washington D.C.

Major themes

The book, and series, looks mainly at possible mitigation and adaptation efforts that could be undertaken to combat the dangers of anthropogenic climate change, though mainly the plot focuses on an international effort to restart the stalled Gulf Stream. The focus is mainly on the scientific approach by the NSF, and its effort to work with the United States government, the UN and other international bodies.

The character of Frank Vanderwal is followed closely through about a year and a half of his life. Alongside his work at the NSF, his storyline focuses mainly on his attempt at a paleolithic lifestyle, which includes focusing on certain types of behaviour that the human brain has adapted to enjoy, such as sleeping outdoors and hunting. Vanderwal also meets a woman who introduces him to the potential and danger of total electronic surveillance.

Reception
Publishers Weekly praised the novel, saying "this ecological disaster tale is guaranteed to anger political and economic conservatives of every stripe, but it provides perhaps the most realistic portrayal ever created of the environmental changes that are already occurring on our planet. It should be required reading for anyone concerned about our world's future."  Kirkus Reviews were mixed in their review saying "though it is fast-paced and exciting, it does occasionally strain believability. Where the author succeeds is in his fascinating speculation about our ecological future, and the steps we could be taking to repair the world for future generations.  First-rate ecological speculation, but a second-rate thriller."  Janet Raloff  reviewing for Science News said "overall, Robinson's engaging book is a fast-moving, upbeat romp driven by science."  The novel was nominated for a Locus Award in 2006.

Notes

2005 American novels
Novels by Kim Stanley Robinson
2005 science fiction novels
Novels set in Washington, D.C.
Hard science fiction
Climate change novels
Bantam Spectra books